Illés Zsolt Sitku (born 5 February 1978) is a Hungarian football player. He currently plays striker for Pálhalma SE.

References

External links
 Profile
 

1978 births
Living people
Footballers from Budapest
Hungarian footballers
Hungary international footballers
Association football forwards
Ferencvárosi TC footballers
Budafoki LC footballers
III. Kerületi TUE footballers
Csepel SC footballers
Pécsi MFC players
Lombard-Pápa TFC footballers
BFC Siófok players
Debreceni VSC players
Fehérvár FC players
Ankaraspor footballers
Újpest FC players
FC Tatabánya players
Dunaújváros PASE players
Dorogi FC footballers
Nemzeti Bajnokság I players
Hungarian expatriate footballers
Expatriate footballers in Turkey
Hungarian expatriate sportspeople in Turkey